Furkating is the main railway junction in the Golaghat district in the state of Assam in India. It is about 10 km away from Golaghat town.

History

The Mariani–Furkating line was operated by Jorhat-Provincial Railway.

The project for the conversion of the Lumding–Dibrugarh section from metre gauge to  broad gauge was completed by the end of 1997.

Amenities
Furkating railway station has a double-bedded retiring room.

It is also equipped with free wifi.

Major Trains
Dibrugarh–Kanyakumari Vivek Express
Dibrugarh–Amritsar Express
Dibrugarh–Chandigarh Express
New Tinsukia–Bengaluru Weekly Express
Dibrugarh-Lalgarh Avadh Assam Express
Dibrugarh - Lokmanya Tilak Terminus Superfast Express
Dibrugarh-Howrah Kamrup Express via Guwahati
New Tinsukia–Rajendra Nagar Weekly Express
Guwahati–Jorhat Town Jan Shatabdi Express
Guwahati - Dibrugarh Town Nagaland Express
Guwahati–Silchar Express
Guwahati - Mariani BG Express
Guwahati–Ledo Intercity Express
Rangiya–New Tinsukia Express

References

External links
 Trains at Furkating

Railway junction stations in Assam
Railway stations in Golaghat district
Tinsukia railway division